Sunday NFL Countdown (branded as Sunday NFL Countdown presented by Snickers for sponsorship reasons) is an American pre-game show broadcast by ESPN as part of the network's coverage of the National Football League. The program is broadcast on Sunday mornings throughout the regular season, featuring segments highlighting news from around the league, as well as previews and analysis of the day's games.  During the NFL playoffs, the program is retitled Postseason NFL Countdown.

Format and history
It is very similar to The NFL Today on CBS and Fox NFL Sunday, which airs on Fox. The show's former names include NFL GameDay from 1985 to 1995, NFL Countdown from 1996 to 1997, and since 1998, Sunday NFL Countdown (to demarcate from the Monday night version of the series). In 2006, the program introduced new graphics and a new logo to resemble the network's Monday Night Football logo.

Chris Berman was the studio host from 1986–2016, succeeding Bob Ley. Jack Youngblood was the first analyst. In 1987, he was replaced by Pete Axthelm and Tom Jackson.

The show's awards include seven Sports Emmy Awards for Outstanding Weekly Show (1988, 1991, 1994, 1995, 2001, 2003, and 2006 seasons) and five CableACE Awards (1989, 1992, 1993, 1994, and 1995 seasons).

In February 2007, ESPN confirmed an earlier report in the Dallas Morning News that Michael Irvin would not be brought back to the show or to the network. On March 12, ESPN confirmed on its website that Michael Irvin's former teammate, Emmitt Smith would fill Irvin's chair, but that arrangement only lasted one season. Keyshawn Johnson also joined the network and has served as an analyst for Countdown, among other programs.

On September 7, 2014, which was the 35th anniversary of ESPN's launch, Sunday NFL Countdown debuted a brand-new studio inside Digital Center 2 of ESPN's main facilities in Bristol. With it, came a new logo and also, a new graphics package similar to that of SportsCenter.  Like SportsCenter, a Helvetica font is used, but with the lower-thirds having white text on a black background, as opposed to black text on a white background.  Starting September 8, every NFL show produced at ESPN now shares its new graphics, new logo, and a new set (except Monday Night Countdown, which itself shares the same graphics package and theme music as Monday Night Football).

On September 13, 2015, Sunday NFL Countdown was shortened from 3 hours to 2 hours, due to a new Sunday edition of NFL Insiders being aired in the 10 a.m. to 11 a.m. ET time slot.  Therefore, Sunday NFL Countdown was moved down an hour to 11 a.m. ET. On September 10, 2017, Sunday NFL Countdown moved back to the 10 a.m. ET time slot and became a 3-hour program once again, resulting in the cancellation of NFL Insiders: Sunday Edition after 2 seasons.

The show usually originates from Bristol, but it originates in the city hosting the Super Bowl for its Super Bowl edition. On November 20, 2016, the show originated from Mexico City, which was hosting the Monday Night Football game the following night between the Houston Texans and Oakland Raiders.  In January 2017, ESPN announced that Berman would leave the show at the end of the 2016-17 season, ending his 31-year tenure as host of this program. Berman was replaced with Samantha Ponder, who had previously co-hosted and contributed to College GameDay from 2012–2016.

On September 13, 2020, Sunday NFL Countdown moved from Bristol to the network's South Street Seaport studios in New York City.  Its sister Monday night show followed the next day.  Both Sunday NFL Countdown and Monday Night Countdown now share the same studio with another ESPN show, First Take.

Controversy
On July 14, 2003, ESPN announced that Rush Limbaugh would be joining the show as a weekly commentator when it premiered on September 7.  Limbaugh would provide the "voice of the fan" and was supposed to spark debate on the show. On September 28, Limbaugh commented about Donovan McNabb, the quarterback of the Philadelphia Eagles:

"Sorry to say this, I don't think he's been that good from the get-go. I think what we've had here is a little social concern in the NFL. The media has been very desirous that a black quarterback do well. There is a little hope invested in McNabb, and he got a lot of credit for the performance of this team that he didn't deserve. The defense carried this team."

On October 1, 2003, less than one week after that comment, Limbaugh resigned from ESPN. The following Sunday on air Tom Jackson said about Limbaugh:

 "Let me just say that it was not our decision to have Rush Limbaugh on this show. I've seen replay after replay of Limbaugh's comments with my face attached as well as that of my colleagues, comments which made us very uncomfortable at the time, although the depth and the insensitive nature of which weren't fully felt until it seemed too late to reply. He was brought here to talk football, and he broke that trust. Rush told us the social commentary for which he is so well known would not cross over to our show, and instead, he would represent the viewpoint of the intelligent, passionate fan. Rush Limbaugh was not a fit for NFL Countdown."

Personalities

Current

Main Panelists
Samantha Ponder: (Host, 2017–present)
Matt Hasselbeck: (Analyst, 2016–present)
Tedy Bruschi: (Analyst 2019–present)
Randy Moss: (Analyst, 2016–present)
Rex Ryan: (Analyst, 2017–present)

Field Reporters
Jeff Darlington: (Correspondent, 2016–present)
Dan Graziano: (Correspondent, 2017–present)
Kimberley A. Martin: (Correspondent, 2020–present)
Sal Paolantonio: (Correspondent, 1995–present)
Dianna Russini: (Correspondent, 2017–present)
Ed Werder: (correspondent, 1998–2016; 2019–present)

NFL Insiders
Adam Schefter: (2009–present)
Chris Mortensen: (1991–present)
Louis Riddick: (2017–present)

Comedy/Impressions
Frank Caliendo: (2012–present)

Former
Josina Anderson: (Correspondent, 2011–2019)
Pete Axthelm: (analyst, 1987–1990)
Chris Berman: (studio host, 1986–2016)
Cris Carter: (analyst, 2008–2015)
Trent Dilfer: (analyst, 2016)
Mike Ditka: (analyst, 2006–2015)
Josh Elliott: (correspondent, 2006–2010)
Greg Garber: (correspondent, 1991–2017)
Merril Hoge: (analyst, 2012–2014)
Michael Irvin: (analyst, 2003–2006)
Tom Jackson: (analyst, 1987–2015)
Ron Jaworski: (contributor, 1990–2005) (analyst, 2006; 2012–2014)
Keyshawn Johnson (analyst, 2007–2015)
Jim Kelly: (analyst, 1998–2000)
Andrea Kremer: (contributor, 1989–2005)
Ray Lewis: (analyst, 2013–2015)
Bob Ley: (studio host, 1985)
Rush Limbaugh: (analyst, 2003)
Kenny Mayne: (contributor, 2005–2012)
Wendi Nix: (co-host, 2014–2016)
Pam Oliver: (reporter, 1993–1994)
Bill Parcells: (contributor, 2007)
Phil Simms: (analyst, 1994)
Stuart Scott: (co-host, 1999–2000)
Sterling Sharpe: (analyst, 1995–2003)
Emmitt Smith: (analyst, 2007)
Joe Theismann: (analyst, 1988–1997)
Jim Trotter: (Correspondent, 2014–2017)
Mike Tirico: (co-host, 1998)
Charles Woodson: (analyst, 2016–2018)
Steve Young: (analyst, 2000–2005) (contributor, 2006–2009)
Jack Youngblood: (analyst, 1985–1986)

See also
Monday Night Football
Monday Night Countdown
NFL Insiders
NFL Live
NFL Matchup
NFL Primetime

References

Press Release: ESPN'S 2006 NFL LINEUP SURROUNDS MONDAY NIGHT FOOTBALL WITH 188 YEARS OF GRIDIRON EXPERIENCE
ESPN.com Limbaugh resigns from NFL show

External links
ESPN.tv show page

1990s American television series
2000s American television series
2010s American television series
2020s American television series
ESPN original programming
American sports television series
1985 American television series debuts
National Football League pregame television series